Supermac may refer to:

 Precursor technology to AES50
 Harold Macmillan (1894–1986), nicknamed "Supermac", Prime Minister of the United Kingdom from 1957 to 1963
 Supermac (cartoon), relating to Harold Macmillan the former British Prime Minister
 Malcolm "Supermac" Macdonald (born 1950), a retired English football player and pundit
 Super Mac Race, a 568 mile sailboat race starting in Lake Michigan off Chicago, IL and ending in Lake Huron off Port Huron, MI.
 Supermac's, an Irish fast food chain covering Northern Ireland and the Republic of Ireland
 Supermac Ltd, Belfast, Northern Ireland's first out of town supermarket, opened 1964 and since demolished for Forestside Shopping Centre
 SuperMac, a brand of Macintosh clones made by UMAX
 SuperMac Technologies, a hardware and software company that developed (amongst other things) the Cinepak codec
 Detective Chief Superintendent Charlie "SuperMac" Mackintosh, a character in Ashes to Ashes, a 2009 BBC television drama